Kalinowiec  is a village in the administrative district of Gmina Łochów, within Węgrów County, Masovian Voivodeship, in east-central Poland.

External links
 Jewish Community in Kalinowiec on Virtual Shtetl

References

Villages in Węgrów County